The X Factor was an Australian television music competition to find new singing talent. The first season premiered on 6 February 2005 and ended on 15 May 2005. The show was cancelled after the series ended due to poor ratings, but was revived in 2010 after Seven Network acquired the rights through meetings with show creator Simon Cowell.

Selection process

Auditions

Masterclass
16-24s – Jack Byrnes, Gemma Purdy, Jacob Butler, Victoria McGee, Vincent Harder
Over 25s – Roslynn Mahe, Cavan Te, Russell Gooley, Reegan Jolley, Jennifer Anderson, Janie Shrapnel
Groups –  2XL, Beyond Society's Kontrol, Kaya, The Brothership, Random

Judges Houses
The 7 eliminated acts were:
16-24s – Jack Byrnes, Victoria McGee
Over 25s – Cavan Te, Jennifer Anderson, Reegan Jolley
Groups –  2XL, Beyond Society's Kontrol

Acts

Live Shows
Colour key
 Act in team Mark

 Act in team Kate

 Act in team John

Contestants' colour key:
  – Act in the bottom two and had to perform again in the final showdown
  – Act received the fewest public votes and was immediately eliminated (no final showdown)

Notes
N/A1 Holden was not required to cast a vote as there was already a majority.

References

Season 1
2005 Australian television seasons
Australia 01